Kutleshevo is a village in the municipality of Dolneni, North Macedonia.

Demographics
Kutleševo appears in the 1467-68 Ottoman defter. The register displayed a mixed Slavic-Albanian anthroponymy, with instances of individuals bearing both Slavic and Albanian names. The names are: Dimitri Arbanas, Dimitri son of Niko, Milush, son of Niko, Rela brother of Niko, Niko son of Kologjer, Dimitri Shahin..

According to the 2021 census, the village had a total of 25 inhabitants. Ethnic groups in the village include:

Macedonians 25

References

Villages in Dolneni Municipality